Tranås is a locality and the seat of Tranås Municipality, Jönköping County, Sweden with 14,197 inhabitants in 2010.

Overview
It is close to the lake Sommen in the north of Småland. Its main commercial center is located along the main street, Storgatan. The symbol of the town is the crane as featured on the town's coat of arms. Some of the bigger employers in the town are Strömsholmen, Pastejköket, OEM, EFG (European Furniture Group) and IVT.

The company Stiga was founded by Stig Hjelmquist in Tranås 1934.
Since 2005 there is free bus service in the central part of town.

The town is also the home of Wood House, a major table tennis blade manufacturing facility

Notable people 
 Ove Fundin, speedway racer
 Simon Holmström, ice hockey player
 Lennart Hyland, television host
 Lena Larsson, interior designer
 Dénis Lindbohm, author
 David Lingmerth, professional golfer
 Magnus Svensson, professional ice hockey player

References 

Municipal seats of Jönköping County
Swedish municipal seats
Populated places in Jönköping County
Populated places in Tranås Municipality